Shere is a former station on the Canadian National Railway east of McBride, British Columbia. It was named by the Grand Trunk Pacific Railway after the engineer in charge of construction of this section of the railway.

References

Populated places in the Regional District of Fraser-Fort George
Localities in the Regional District of Fraser-Fort George
Canadian National Railway stations in British Columbia